Fredrick Peter Hinds (born 28 January 1999) is an English professional footballer who plays as a striker for Isthmian League club Wingate & Finchley.

Career

Luton Town
Born in Potton, Bedfordshire, Hinds joined Luton Town at the age of seven and progressed through the club's youth system. He was a member of the under-18 team that won the Youth Alliance South East title and the Youth Alliance Cup in 2015–16, and also reached the quarter-finals of the FA Youth Cup, in which they lost 1–0 to Blackburn Rovers. Hinds made his Luton debut on 4 October 2016 in a 2–0 victory over West Bromwich Albion U23s in the EFL Trophy.

Bristol City
On 31 January 2017, Hinds signed for Championship club Bristol City for an undisclosed fee, signing a two-and-a-half-year contract, with the option of a further year. On 8 August 2017, Hinds made his debut for Bristol City, scoring in a 5–0 victory over Plymouth Argyle in the EFL Cup first round. He scored Bristol City's first goal in the second round two weeks later in a 3–2 away win over Premier League team Watford.

On 30 August 2017, Hinds signed for League Two club Cheltenham Town on loan until January 2018. He returned to Bristol City after the loan expired, having made 14 appearances and scored one goal for Cheltenham.

Hinds joined National League club Wrexham on 27 July 2018 on a season-long loan. However, he made no appearances for the club and his loan was terminated by mutual agreement on 23 November 2018. He joined National League South club Bath City on 4 January 2019 on a one-month loan. The loan was extended until the end of 2018–19 on 5 February.

He joined Colchester United of League Two on 28 August 2019 on loan until January 2020.

Non-league
Following his release from Bristol City, Hinds joined National League South side, Hemel Hempstead Town ahead of the 2021–22 campaign. In November 2021, he dropped down a division again to sign for Isthmian League Premier Division side Wingate & Finchley.

Career statistics

References

1999 births
Living people
People from Potton
Footballers from Bedfordshire
English footballers
Association football forwards
Luton Town F.C. players
Bristol City F.C. players
Cheltenham Town F.C. players
Wrexham A.F.C. players
Bath City F.C. players
Colchester United F.C. players
Hemel Hempstead Town F.C. players
Wingate & Finchley F.C. players
English Football League players
National League (English football) players
Isthmian League players